Ma Sanli (Xiao'erjing: , ; 1914 – 11 February 2003) was a Chinese comedian in the traditional Xiangsheng or "crosstalk" style.

Biography
Ma was born in Beijing; he was of the Hui ethnic group, and the son and grandson of practitioners of Xiangsheng.  He was apprenticed to Zhou Deshan in 1929. Ma was a Chinese Muslim, his faith being Islam.

He came to be noted for avoiding complication in a way that kept his performances accessible to a mass audience. He pursued his art in Tianjin.

He became a widower in 1984. In December 2001, Ma retired from the Xiangsheng trade.

On 11 February 2003, he died in Tianjin after a long battle with cancer.

Works 
 Nonsense
 Drunken old man
 Chasing
 Car horn
 Health check
 The charm of the comic 
 Recipe
 Eat dumplings
 Sloppy
 Eighty-one floor
 Write Pair
 Meeting the fans
 Physiognomy
 Emotional and health
 Xijiangyue
 Boast Residential
 Remedies
 Pairs
 Three Character Classic
 Pull foreign films 
 Buying Monkeys
 Meeting Fiend 
 Yellow Crane Tower

References

External links
 Ma Sanli Biodata

1914 births
2003 deaths
Male actors from Beijing
Chinese xiangsheng performers
Hui people
Chinese Muslims
Chinese male stage actors
20th-century comedians